3040 may refer to:

In general
 3040, a number in the 3000 (number) range
 A.D. 3040, a year of the 4th millennium CE
 3040 BC, a year in the 4th millennium BCE

Roads numbered 3040
 Hawaii Route 3040, a state highway
 Louisiana Highway 3040, a state highway
 Texas Farm to Market Road 3040, a state highway
 A3040 road (Great Britain)

Other uses
 3040 Kozai, a near-Mars asteroid, the 3040th asteroid registered
 Commodore 3040, a floppy drive unit
 3040th Aircraft Storage Group of the U.S. Air Force

See also

 , a WWII Kriegsmarine submarine